Coulterella capitata is a species of flowering plants in the daisy family. It is the only species of genus Coulterella. Coulterella was placed in the monotypic subtribe Coulterellinae, but is now included in Varillinae.
Coulterella capitata is endemic to the State of Baja California Sur in northwestern Mexico.

References

Monotypic Asteraceae genera
Tageteae
Flora of Baja California Sur